2009 in swimming documents the highlights of competitive international swimming during 2009.

Major events

World
5–11 July: Swimming at the 2009 Summer Universiade in Belgrade, Serbia
19–25 July: Open water swimming at the 2009 World Aquatics Championships in Rome, Italy
26 July – 2 August: Swimming at the 2009 World Aquatics Championships in Rome, Italy
2009 FINA Swimming World Cup:
16–17 October: Durban, South Africa
23–25 October: Rio de Janeiro, Brazil (cancelled)
6–7 November: Moscow, Russia
10–11 November: Stockholm, Sweden
14–15 November: Berlin, Germany
21–22 November: Singapore

Regional
27 June – 1 July: Swimming at the 2009 Mediterranean Games in Pescara, Italy
30 June – 5 July: Central American and Caribbean Swimming Championships in Barquisimeto, Venezuela
2–6 July: Swimming at the 2009 Asian Youth Games, Singapore
8–12 July: European Junior Swimming Championships in Prague, Czech Republic
30 October – 9 November: Swimming at the 2009 Asian Indoor Games in Hanoi, Vietnam
10–13 December: European Short Course Swimming Championships in Istanbul, Turkey
10–14 December: Swimming at the 2009 Southeast Asian Games in Vientiane, Laos

World records
The tables below lists all world records broken or equalled during 2009. Records are listed in each section in date order, with records which were subsequently broken later in the year with a khaki shaded background. Records which are yet to be ratified, or are awaiting ratification following the outcomes of the "Dubai Suits Charter" and related actions by the FINA Swimsuit Commission, are listed in italics. The records shaded in light blue were not ratified by FINA and are not to be considered as the world record for that event. The given references give further details regarding the non-ratification of the relevant records.

147 new world records were reported in 2009 (although some later disallowed), rewriting the world record progression in 69 of the 82 events in which FINA recognises world record standards.

Men's long course

Women's long course

Men's short course

Women's short course

Other events

National championships
Long course

Short course

Other major meets
19–21 March: NCAA Women's Swimming and Diving Championships Division 1 Finals in College Station, TX, USA
26–28 March: NCAA Men's Swimming and Diving Championships Division 1 Finals in College Station, TX, USA
9–10 May: Australia v Japan Duel in the Pool in Canberra, Australia
Mare Nostrum 2009:
6–7 June: Gran Premi Internacional Ciutat de Barcelona in Barcelona, Spain
9–10 June: Meeting Arena de Canet en Roussillon in Canet, France
13–14 June: Meeting International de Natation de Monte-Carlo in Monte Carlo, Monaco
19–23 July: Swimming at the 2009 Maccabiah Games, Netanya, Israel
4–8 August: US Open in Federal Way, WA, USA
6–9 August: British Short Course Grand Prix in Leeds, United Kingdom
18–19 December: European Select v United States Duel in the Pool in Manchester, United Kingdom

Paralympic swimming
15–19 August: Swimming at the 2009 ASEAN Para Games in Kuala Lumpur, Malaysia
18–24 October: 2009 IPC Swimming European Championships in Reykjavík, Iceland
29 November – 5 December: 2009 IPC Swimming World Championships (25 m) in Rio de Janeiro, Brazil

References

 
Swimming by year